Thompson is a provincial electoral division in the Canadian province of Manitoba. It was created by redistribution in 1968 from parts of Churchill and Rupertsland (now Keewatinook), and has formally existed since the provincial election of 1969.

Thompson is in northern Manitoba. It is bordered by Keewatinook to the east and Flin Flon to the west. The city of Thompson, which was incorporated shortly before the riding's creation, is its only major urban centre. Almost half of the riding's residents live in that community.

The riding's population in 1996 was 19,349. In 1999, the average family income was $56,402, and the unemployment rate was 12.60%. The riding's economic character is primarily working-class, with 17% of its economy coming from the mining sector.

Forty-two per cent of the riding's residents are aboriginal, the third highest rate in the province.

Thompson is usually considered safe for the New Democratic Party, which represented the riding almost continually since its creation. The current MLA is New Democrat Eric Redhead, who was elected in the provincial by-election on June 7, 2022. His predecessor Danielle Adams was previously elected in the 2019 Manitoba general election on September 10, 2019, and served until her death on December 9, 2021.

List of provincial representatives

Electoral results

Previous boundaries

References

Thompson
Thompson, Manitoba